Te Wera (Māori for "the burning") may refer to:

People
Te Wera (ca. 1760–70s), rangatira of Kai Tahu based at Huriawa Peninsula
Te Wera Hauraki (died 1839), rangatira of Ngapuhi based at Te Mahia
Penetana Papahurihia (Te Atua Wera; died 1875), tohunga of Ngapuhi
Ngāti Te Wera, a hapū of Whanganui Māori

Places
Paterson Inlet / Whaka a Te Wera, Stewart Island/Rakiura, New Zealand

See also
 Wera (disambiguation)
 Te Urewera